The Children’s Guild is a leading Mid-Atlantic nonprofit organization serving children, families, and child serving organizations dedicated to transforming the way children are cared for and educated across Maryland and Washington, DC, through education, career services, and behavioral health. Since its founding in 1953, The Children’s Guild has provided individualized transformational experiences to ensure children, families, and communities thrive. It has grown from a one-room preschool to serving thousands of children and their families through special education and charter schools, school-based mental health services, treatment foster care, autism services, family mental and behavioral health services, career and apprenticeship programs, and training and consultation.

The Children’s Guild is a Commission on Accreditation of Rehabilitation Facilities (CARF) internationally accredited organization and recipient of the prestigious Platinum Seal of Transparency from GuideStar, a leading charity rating organization.

It is one of the largest providers of charter schools, special education, autism services, treatment foster care, and family mental and behavioral health services in the Baltimore-Washington region. These organizations include:

 Special Education Schools
 The Children’s Guild, Inc. Baltimore Campus
 The Children’s Guild School of Prince George's County
 The Children’s Guild – Transformation Academy
 Charter Schools
 Monarch Academy Glen Burnie
 Monarch Global Academy Laurel
 Monarch Academy Annapolis
 The Children’s Guild DC Public Charter School
 Pre-K and Preschool Programs
 Monarch Preschool College Park
 Monarch Academy Annapolis Preschool
 Treatment Foster Care
 Outpatient Mental Health Clinic
 TranZed Academy for Working Students
 TranZed Apprenticeship Services

The schools and programs of The Children’s Guild are united by how they care for and educate children and families. Guided by a unique and deliberate engagement process, they create a flexible, brain-compatible organizational culture that emphasizes the values, skills, and beliefs necessary for a successful life.

The Children’s Guild has impacted over 1,400,000 people through the programs and services they offer. There are over 2,800 students currently enrolled at The Children’s Guild and Monarch Academy schools. They have over 80 school partners where kids receive behavior health services and therapy.

Jenny Livelli is the current president and CEO of The Children’s Guild. An unwavering advocate for children, Jenny applies her visionary leadership and business acumen to build The Children’s Guild’s capacity to positively impact the children and families it serves.

With her considerable expertise in administration, special education, continuous quality improvement and behavioral health, she is uniquely positioned to lead the organization in building a culture that engages students, fosters achievement, and meets the needs of every learner.

Prior to being named CEO in March 2021, Jenny served as chief operating officer of the organization. She has also served as director of continuous quality improvement.

References

External links 
 The Children's Guild website
 The Children's Guild, Inc. Baltimore Campus website
 The Children's Guild School of Prince George's County website
 The Children's Guild-Transformation Academy website
 Monarch Academy Glen Burnie website
 Monarch Global Academy website
 Monarch Academy Annapolis website
 The Children's Guild DC Public Charter School website
 Monarch Preschool College Park website
 Monarch Academy Annapolis Preschool website
 Treatment Foster Care website
 Outpatient Mental Health Clinic website
 TranZed Academy for Working Students website
 TranZed Apprenticeship Services website

Education in Maryland
Special schools in the United States